Fujitsu, a multinational computer hardware and IT services company, provides services and consulting as well as a range of products including computing products, software, telecommunications, microelectronics, and more. Fujitsu also offers customized IT products that go beyond the off-the shelf products listed below.

Products and services

References

Fujitsu products
Fujitsu products
Fujitsu products